Kota Raja  is a village in Sikur district, West Nusa Tenggara Province, Indonesia.

References

Kota Raja
Kota Raja